The Assyrian Academic Society (AAS) was established in 1983, as an academic, educational and minority organization of Assyrians in the United States. From its foundation, AAS was based in Chicago, a city with one of the largest communities of Assyrian Americans. It was established as a non-governmental organization dedicated to promotion of Assyrian cultural and historical heritage. Its activities included organization of lectures and seminars, promotion of Assyrian literature and native language, and cooperation with other Assyrian organizations, both in the United States and worldwide. Its goal was to serve as a center for advancement and promotion of cultural developments within the Assyrian diaspora and to introduce Assyrian heritage to the outside world. The organization was a registered 501(C)(3) non-profit organization, without political affiliations.

Activities 

Since 1986, ASS was associated with the publishing of the Journal of the Assyrian Academic Society, but in 1997 several disputes arose, resulting in the creation of two editorial boards. The one under the jurisdiction of ASS continued to publish the journal under its original name, until 2000, while the other initiated publishing of separate editions under a new name: Journal of Assyrian Academic Studies. The latest issue of the journal appeared in 2015.

In 1996, the "Assyrian Dictionary Project" was initiated by AAS, aimed to create new editions of English-Assyrian (Neo-Aramaic) and Assyrian-English dictionaries, also engaging in other linguistic projects, aimed to popularize native languages.

In 1999, AAS joined a series of discussions, initiated by the United States Census Bureau in relation to complex questions of ethnic designations, that would be used in the forthcoming 2000 United States census. As a result of those discussions, AAS supported a compromise solution, proposed by the Census Bureau, that was based on the use of a compound "Assyrian/Chaldean/Syriac" designation for all communities that self-identify with those appellations.

Since 2003, AAS joined efforts of Assyrian diaspora aimed to support Assyrians in Iraq in their endeavors to secure national, religious and other minority rights, and achieve constitutional recognition in Iraq.

In 2005, AAS initiated a new project, known as the "Iraq Sustainable Democracy Project", headed by Michael Youash, and aimed to secure and improve collective rights of Assyrians and other minority communities in Iraq. The project received support from various Assyrian organizations, and from several USA institutions and politicians, including Congressman Mark Kirk.

Within the field of Middle Eastern studies, AAS cooperated with the Middle East Studies Association of North America (MESA), participating in activities and programs that received acknowledgment by scholars working in the field.

Since 2014, collective efforts in the fields of organization and promotion of academic and educational activities among Assyrian Americans were regrouped and restructured, and in 2019 new organization was created: the "Assyrian Studies Association", that continued traditional cooperation with MESA, previously established and conducted by AAS over the course of two decades.

See also 
 Assyrian Americans
 Assyrian Policy Institute
 Donny George Youkhanna

References

Sources

External links 
 Assyrian Academic Society Site (archived)
 Journal of Assyrian Academic Studies (archived)
 AINA (2007): Assyrian Academic Society website hacked by Turks

Assyrian-American culture in Illinois
Assyrian-American organizations
Scientific societies based in the United States
Organizations established in 1983
1983 establishments in the United States
Organizations based in Chicago